The 2021 Saskatchewan Roughriders season was the 63rd season for the team in the Canadian Football League. It was the club's 112th year overall, and its 105th season of play. Although the club failed to record a second consecutive first place finish in the West Division, the Roughriders qualified for the post-season for the fourth consecutive season of play on October 30, 2021 following a win over the Montreal Alouettes. After defeating the Calgary Stampeders in the West Semi-Final, the Roughriders then lost the West Final to the Winnipeg Blue Bombers for the second consecutive season. This was the second season under head coach Craig Dickenson and general manager Jeremy O'Day.

An 18-game season schedule was originally released on November 20, 2020, but it was announced on April 21, 2021 that the start of the season would likely be delayed until August and feature a 14-game schedule. On June 15, 2021, the league released the revised 14-game schedule with regular season play beginning on August 5, 2021.

Offseason

CFL Global Draft
The 2021 CFL Global Draft took place on April 15, 2021. The Roughriders selected fifth in each round of the snake draft.

CFL National Draft
The 2021 CFL Draft took place on May 4, 2021. The Roughriders had six selections in the six-round snake draft and had the second pick in odd rounds and the eighth pick in even rounds.

Preseason
Due to the shortening of the season, the CFL confirmed that pre-season games would not be played in 2021.

Planned schedule

Regular season

Standings

Schedule 
The Roughriders initially had a schedule that featured 18 regular season games beginning on June 12 and ending on October 23. However, due to the COVID-19 pandemic in Canada, the Canadian Football League delayed the start of the regular season to August 5, 2021 and the Roughriders began their 14-game season on August 6, 2021.

Notes
 Saskatchewan was originally scheduled to host the first of their two games against Edmonton, but a COVID-19 outbreak affecting the Elks resulted in the League rescheduling a game originally scheduled for August 26 between Edmonton and Toronto. To help accommodate this change, the venues for the Roughriders' home-and-home series against the Elks have been reversed.

Post-season

Schedule

Team

Roster

Coaching staff

References

External links
 

Saskatchewan Roughriders seasons
2021 Canadian Football League season by team
2021 in Saskatchewan